Craig Dean (born 1 July 1976) is a former English footballer who played as a left back, his works as the Head Of Emerging Talent for Premier League side Leeds United.

Career

He came through the academy of Manchester United F.C. and during his career played for clubs in countries such as the England,  Norway, Sweden, Iceland, Malta, Finland,  He also represented England national Youth Team.

Coaching career
He currently works for Leeds United as Head Of Emerging Talent. He previously worked at Newcastle United as Head Of Football Development between 2007 and 2013, before joining Oxford United as a chief scout in 2014. He has also worked for the Football Association.

References

External links 
 
 Veikkausliiga Profile

1976 births
Living people
Association football midfielders
Association football defenders
English footballers
Kidderminster Harriers F.C. players
Burton Albion F.C. players
Hednesford Town F.C. players
Worcester City F.C. players
Selfoss men's football players
Nuneaton Borough F.C. players
Dundalk F.C. players
Crawley Town F.C. players
Gresley F.C. players
Tvøroyrar Bóltfelag players
Östersunds FK players
Hinckley Town F.C. players
TP-47 players
Napier City Rovers FC players
Valletta F.C. players
Maltese Premier League players
Veikkausliiga players
English expatriate footballers
Expatriate footballers in Iceland
Expatriate soccer players in the United States
Expatriate footballers in Malta
Expatriate footballers in the Faroe Islands
Expatriate footballers in Sweden
Expatriate footballers in Finland
Expatriate association footballers in the Republic of Ireland
Expatriate association footballers in New Zealand
English football managers
English expatriate football managers
Association football scouts
Leeds United F.C. non-playing staff